Perenniporia fraxinea is a species of poroid fungus in the family Polyporaceae. It is a plant pathogen infecting ash trees.

See also
 List of sweetgum diseases

References

Fungal tree pathogens and diseases
Perenniporia
Fungi described in 1790
Fungi of Europe